This page provides the party lists put forward in New Zealand's 1999 election. Party lists determine (in the light of proportional voting) the appointment of list MPs under the mixed-member proportional (MMP) electoral system. Only registered parties are eligible for the party vote and are required to submit party lists. Unregistered parties that are only contesting electorates do not have party lists.

Parliamentary parties
The following parties gained representation:

ACT New Zealand

Alliance

Green Party

Labour Party

The Labour Party had 60 candidates on their list.

National Party

The National Party had 64 candidates on their list.

New Zealand First

United NZ Party

Unsuccessful registered parties
The following registered parties did not gain representation:

Animals First

Aotearoa Legalise Cannabis Party

Christian Heritage Party

Freedom Movement

Future New Zealand

Libertarianz

McGillicuddy Serious

Mana Maori Movement

Mauri Pacific

Natural Law Party

NMP

OneNZ Party

Republican Party

South Island Party

The People's Choice Party

Te Tawharau
In the 1999 election, Te Tawharau stood in affiliation with the Mana Maori Movement, and three Te Tawharau candidates appeared on the Mana Maori Movement list. Te Tawharau therefore had no list of its own. However, the Mana Maori Movement section of this page identifies those candidates attached to Te Tawharau.

References

 
 

1999 New Zealand general election
Lists of New Zealand political candidates
Party lists